Table tennis women's doubles at the 2018 Commonwealth Games was held at the Oxenford Studios on the Gold Coast, Australia from 11 to 13 April.

Finals

Top half

Section 1

Section 2

Bottom half

Section 3

Section 4

References

Women's doubles
Common